Raymond Longford (born John Walter Hollis Longford, 23 September 18782 April 1959) was a prolific Australian film director, writer, producer, and actor during the silent era. Longford was a major director of the silent film era of the Australian cinema. He formed a production team with Lottie Lyell. His contributions to Australian cinema with his ongoing collaborations with Lyell, including The Sentimental Bloke (1919) and The Blue Mountains Mystery (1921), prompted the Australian Film Institute's AFI Raymond Longford Award, inaugurated in 1968, to be named in his honour.

Biography
John Walter Hollis Longford was born in Hawthorn, a suburb of Melbourne, the son of John Walter Longford, a civil servant originally from Sydney, and his English wife, Charlotte Maria. His family soon started referring to him as "Ray". By 1880, they briefly moved to Paynesville, then went to Sydney when Longford's father became a warder at Darlinghurst Gaol.

Longford became a sailor and spent his early life at sea. He started acting on the stage in India under the name Raymond Hollis Longford. In the early 1900s he toured Australia and New Zealand with Edwin Geach's Popular Dramatic Organisation, and Clarke and Meynell companies. He was a stage manager for the Liliam Meyers Dramatic Company. Longford often appeared alongside a young actress called Lottie Lyell, who would become Longford's key creative partner.

He was an early member of the Australian actors union, a forerunner to Actors Equity.

Film career
In 1907 Longford worked on a film produced by Charles Cozens Spencer about the fight between Tommy Burns and Jack Johnson, probably the first movie Longford was involved in. He then began appearing in movies for Spencer as an actor under the direction of Alfred Rolfe such as Captain Midnight, the Bush King (1911).

Move into directing
Rolfe eventually left Spencer's company to make films elsewhere so in 1911 Spencer hired Longford to direct his first feature, The Fatal Wedding, adapted from a play in which Longford had appeared on stage and starring Lyell. Made quickly, with a limited budget and small crew, it was a major financial success and launched his career behind the camera.

Longford followed this up with several other play adaptations for Spencer including The Romantic Story of Margaret Catchpole (1911), Sweet Nell of Old Drury and The Midnight Wedding (1912); Longford also wrote an original for the screen The Tide of Death. Lyell appeared in most of these and also made increasingly important contributions behind the scene as a writer, editor, producer, and co-director.

Freelancing
Charles Cozens Spencer eventually withdrew from Australian film production due to the formation of "the Combine" (which absorbed Spencer's old company). This left Longford without his main backer and he found it increasingly difficult to secure funding for a time.

He went to work for the Fraser Film Release and Photographic Company for who he made a feature and a number of shorts, however, they eventually ended the contract after Longford became involved in a lawsuit following the making of the highly popular The Silence of Dean Maitland (1914).

Longford had an operation in March 1915.

He made another number of shorts for a variety of companies and taught film acting. He then made two films in New Zealand and also became embroiled in another legal battle over The Church and the Woman (1917).

In September 1916, he worked for Crick and Jones preparing scenarios.

Career peak: The Sentimental Bloke
Longford's career revived towards the end of World War I when he helped establish the Southern Cross Feature Film Company in South Australia. He enjoyed a large box office success with The Woman Suffers (1918) (despite the film being banned in New South Wales) which enabled him to get finance for an adaptation of the poetry of C. J. Dennis, The Sentimental Bloke (1919). This was an enormous critical and popular success, and is regarded as one of the greatest Australian films of all time. Longford followed it with another hit, On Our Selection (1920), from the stories of Steele Rudd.

The popularity of these two movies saw Longford move away from melodramatic convention to more realistic treatment of subject matter. He said around this time:
You see, one   might  say that  three parts of your picture audience is composed of women, and women, above everything else, are impressionists. It is  the human, and not the spectacular side of  a   film   that captures their attention and win their sympathy and admiration. A man coming out of a picture show will be heard to remark to his mate: “s’wonderful the way  they get these things up, ain’t it, nowadays.' He  has  been looking at oit in a speculative light, but not so the woman. She says nothing, but she wipes the tears from   her   eyes, tears of real sympathy, indicative of pure appreciation, and for   days thereafter, thinks, not of the construction of the plot, nor its   cleverness, but of the varied experiences and emotions through which the hero   and heroine have passed.
Both Bloke and Selection led to well-received sequels which were also directed by Longford. He and Lyell had another hit with The Blue Mountains Murder Mystery.

Decline
As the 1920s went on, Longford again found difficulties securing finance and/or distribution for his films. He and Lyell formed a company and he made some for Australasian Films but the collaboration was not a successful one. In October 1925 Longford was appointed producer of Master Pictures.

In 1925, Lottie Lyell died of tuberculosis and Longford's career never recovered.

In 1926, it was announced Longford would serve on the board of the film company Phillips Film Productions Ltd, but little seems to have come of this. He gave evidence at the 1928 Royal Commission on the Moving Picture Industry in Australia where he urged the introduction of a quota for local movies and complained about the influence of the Combine of Australasian Films and Union Theatres on local production.

Longford appeared in bankruptcy court in 1929 but managed to tour Europe the following year, spending 18 months touring various filmmaking facilities. "Naturally the talkies have revolutionised everything", he said. "And to some extent I now feel as if I am returning to my original occupation — the talking stage."

He returned to Australia in February 1930 and told Gayne Dexter that :
For years and years I fought for the English industry. For years and years I battled and agitated against the Americans. But now, after seeing the English film men at work, I am sorry to say that I backed the wrong side. It was only through the kindness of the American executives in London — the very men against whom I had fought — that I was able to visit studios and get an insight into production conditions. I am convinced that it is impossible for anybody to teach England to make pictures: the producers don't want to learn: the English distributors don't want Australian films: and if we ever get a market there, our productions will have to be through Australian channels. That has already been demonstrated by the fact that English distributors have not accepted a single Australian film, even under the quota laws, whereas the American distributors operating in the British Isles have taken eight or ten — and paid cash for them!
Longford said UFA were the most advanced studio he saw.

Sound era
On his return to Australia Lonford sought financing for a film about the Australia Light Horse in World War I, Desert Legion, with a budget of £50,000. He was unable to secure this and started lobbying for a quota for local films.

In the early 1930s Longford worked steadily as an actor and assistant director on such films as Diggers in Blighty. He assisted Beaumont Smith with the direction of The Hayseeds (1933) and Splendid Fellows (1934) (according to contemporary reports he directed The Hayseeds).

He managed to direct another feature, The Man They Could Not Hang (1934) – although he missed the premiere due to illness which required hospitalization.

That year he was elected head of the New South Wales Talking Picture Producers Association with the aim of promoting a quota for Australian films.

Mastercraft
In 1935 he established Mastercraft Film Corporation Ltd to take advantage of the 1935 NSW Quota Act but the hoped for boom in production did not eventuate and Matercraft never received the subscribers they needed to become viable and made no movies. The company was eventually bought out Stuart F. Doyle.

In 1939 Longford sued some Mastercraft executives for libel and settled out of court.

Later years
Longford managed to stay employed in the film industry during the 1930s but found this impossible with the advent of World War II, which brought local production to an almost complete halt. During the war he was a clerk for the U.S. military stationed in Australia, then he became a tally man and night watchman on the Sydney wharfs.

In October 1950 Longford was profiled by Ernest Harrison for AM magazine, then in 1955 a complete 35 mm print of The Sentimental Bloke was discovered and screened at the Sydney and Melbourne Film Festivals, bringing renewed attention to Longford. He died on 2 April 1959 at the age of 80.

Personal life
Longford married Melena Louisa Keen at St Luke's Anglican Church, Concord, Sydney, on 5 February 1900. They had one child, a son, Victor Hollis Longford. Longford and Melena later separated and he started a relationship with Lottie Lyell, but could not marry her because Melena refused to divorce him until 1926, the year after Lyell died. Melina was influenced by her father, William Henry Keen, who did not approve of divorce. William Keen died in 1922.

In 1933, Longford married for a second time, to Emilie Elizabeth Anschutz. He is buried at Macquarie Park cemetery, North Ryde, NSW, Australia alongside Lottie Lyell.

Longford Lyell Life Achievement Award

Named in Longford and Lottie Lyell's honour, the AACTA Longford Lyell Award is the Australian film industry's highest accolade for an individual based on their contributions to "unwavering commitment over many years to excellence in the film and television industries and has, through their body of work to date, contributed substantially to the enrichment of Australian screen culture". Since the introduction of the award by the AFI in 1968, winners have included Ken G. Hall, Peter Weir, Tim Burstall, Bud Tingwell, David Stratton, George Miller, Phillip Adams, Barry Jones, Jack Thompson, Geoffrey Rush, and Cate Blanchett.

Filmography

Director

The Fatal Wedding (1911)
The Romantic Story of Margaret Catchpole (1911)
Sweet Nell of Old Drury (1911)
The Tide of Death (1912)
The Midnight Wedding (1912)
Naming the Federal Capital of Australia (1913) – 1,020-foot documentary
Australia Calls (1913)
Pommy Arrives in Australia (1913)
'Neath Austral Skies (1913)
The Swagman's Story (1914)
The Silence of Dean Maitland (1914)
Taking his Chance (1914) – short
Trooper Campbell (1914) – short
We'll Take her Children in amongst our own (1915) – short
Ma Hogan's New Boarder (1915) – short
The Mutiny of the Bounty (1916)
A Maori Maid's Love (1916)
The Church and the Woman (1917)
The Woman Suffers (1918)
The Sentimental Bloke (1919)
Ginger Mick (1920)
On Our Selection (1920)
Rudd's New Selection (1921)
The Blue Mountains Mystery (1921)
The Dinkum Bloke (1923)
Australia Calls (1923) – documentary
An Australian by Marriage (1923) – documentary
Australia Land of Sunshine (1923) – documentary
Fisher's Ghost (1924)
The Bushwhackers (1925)
Peter Vernon's Silence (1926)
The Pioneers (1926)
Sunrise (1926)
Hills of Hate (1926)
Harmony Row (1933) (associate director)
Waltzing Matilda (1933) (associate director)
The Hayseeds (1933) (assistant director)
Splendid Fellows (1934) (assistant director)
The Man They Could Not Hang (1934)

Actor only
The Life and Adventures of John Vane, the Notorious Australian Bushranger (1910)
Captain Midnight, the Bush King (1911)
Captain Starlight, or Gentleman of the Road (1911)
The Life of Rufus Dawes (1911) as Gabbett
Diggers in Blighty (1933) as Von Schieling
The Avenger (1937) as Warren
Dad and Dave Come to Town (1938) as Policeman
Wings of Destiny (1940) as Peters
Dad Rudd, MP (1940) as Electoral Officer
Racing Luck (1941)

Crew member
Burns and Johnson Fight (1908) – 4,000-foot film
It's a Long Way to Tipperary (1915)
The Sentimental Bloke (1932)
His Royal Highness (1932)

Theatre credits
Camille
The Power of the Cross
Saturday Night in London (1907)
The Worst Woman in London (1907)
The Heart of a Hero by Lingford Carson (1908) – Edwin Geach Dramatic Organisation
The Midnight Hour (1908)
The Woman Pays (1908)
The Greatest Scoundrel Living by McLeod Loder (1908) – starring May Renno – also played with A Woman's Honour (1908) and The Professor's Dilemma (1908) – Longford directed
Who is the Woman? (1909) – directed for the May Renno Company
An Englishman's Home (1909) – with Lottie Lyell
The Midnight Wedding (1910) – with Lyell
Her Love Against the World and Why Men Love Women (1910) – with Lyell
The Fatal Wedding (1910)
Every Inch a Man (1910) – toured with The Fatal Wedding
Officer 666 (1922)
Treasure Island (1932) – Melbourne

Unfilmed projects
Among the projects Longford planned but did not film included:
a screen version of Robbery Under Arms;
The Desert Legion, a tale of the Australian Lighthorse in the Sinai and Palestine Campaign during World War I;
four unnamed projects for Mastercraft films in the 1930s, which were to be made under Longford's supervision.

References

External links

Raymond Longford & Lottie Lyell by William M. Drew
Raymond Longford at Australian Dictionary of Biography
Raymond Longford at National Film and Sound Archive
Biography at Austlit
Footage of an interview with Longford from 1958 at Stateline Canberra

Australian film directors
Australian screenwriters
Australian film producers
1878 births
1959 deaths
Australian waterside workers
20th-century Australian screenwriters
Male actors from Sydney